Moisson is a commune in the Yvelines department in the Île-de-France region in north-central France.

History

Moisson was the site of the 6th World Scout Jamboree, held in 1947, which brought together 24,152 Scouts and Guides from all over the world.

See also
Pierre Joubert
Communes of the Yvelines department

References

Communes of Yvelines
Yvelines communes articles needing translation from French Wikipedia